Lady Cove is a settlement located southeast of Clarenville, Newfoundland and Labrador. The Post Office was established in 1898 and the first Postmaster was Hayward Burt. It had a population of 120 in 1940 and 161 in 1956.

See also
 List of communities in Newfoundland and Labrador

Populated places in Newfoundland and Labrador